Mayor Brown may refer to numerous mayors:

Adam M. Brown, mayor of Pittsburgh in 1901
Aja Brown, mayor of Compton, CA
Arthur Winton Brown, mayor of Wellington, New Zealand in 1886 and 1890
Byron Brown, mayor of Buffalo, NY
Charles Brown (mayor), mayor of Murray, Utah from 1906 to 1909
Daniel Brown (politician), acting mayor of Knoxville, Tennessee
Darius A. Brown, mayor of Kansas City, Missouri from 1910 to 1911
 David Brown, mayor of Charlottesville, Virginia in 2004–2008
Fergy Brown, mayor of York, Ontario from 1988 to 1994
Fielding A. Brown, mayor of Key West, Florida, from 1833 to 1834
George William Brown, mayor of Baltimore, Maryland from 1860 to 1861
Jerry Brown, former mayor of Oakland, CA and former California governor
Joseph Brown (Missouri politician), twenty-first mayor of St. Louis, Missouri
Joseph Owen Brown, mayor of Pittsburgh, Pennsylvania from 1901 to 1903
Lee P. Brown, mayor of Houston, Texas from 1998 to 2004
Len Brown, current mayor of Auckland in New Zealand
Michael Brown (mayor), mayor of Grand Forks, North Dakota
Samuel Brown (mayor), mayor of Wellington, New Zealand from 1887 to 1888
Whitford Brown, 1st mayor of Porirua
William E. Brown Jr., former mayor of Ann Arbor, Michigan
Willie Brown (politician), former mayor of San Francisco, CA
Yvonne Brown, current (as of 2007) mayor of Tchula, Mississippi

In fiction
Mayor Brown, the main antagonist of the 2010 film, Yogi Bear

See also
Mayer Brown, law firm
Brown (surname)